The Afghanistan national football team ( Tīm-e Millī-e Fūtbāl-e Afghānestān) is the national football team of Afghanistan and is controlled by the Afghanistan Football Federation. Founded in 1922, they played their first international game against Iran in Kabul, 1941. Afghanistan then joined FIFA in 1948 and the AFC in 1954, as one of the founding members. They play their home games at the Ghazi National Olympic Stadium in Kabul, the capital of Afghanistan. In 2013, Afghanistan won the 2013 SAFF Championship and earned the "FIFA Fair Play Award". Afghanistan has never qualified for the AFC Asian Cup.

History

Early history

Formed in 1922 and affiliated to FIFA since 1948, the Afghanistan Football Federation was one of the founding members of the Asian Football Confederation in 1954.

The first football club established in the country, Mahmoudiyeh F.C., was founded in 1934. Three years later the team traveled to India and took part in 18 games of which they won 8, lost 9 and drew 1. The second football club founded was Ariana Kabul F.C. which was established in 1941. This team traveled to Tehran, Iran upon invitation, played 3 games, winning one game and losing two.

Afghanistan's only appearance and first FIFA international match was at the Olympic Games football tournament in the 1948 Summer Olympic Games when they played Luxembourg on 26 July 1948 and lost 6–0. Prior to 2002, Afghanistan was last seen on the international stage during the 1984 AFC Asian Cup qualification, with its last match lost 6–1 against Jordan on 20 September 1984. Afghanistan played no international games from 1984 to 2002, due to the latter years of the Soviet–Afghan War, civil war in Afghanistan (1992–1996), and the Taliban regime's ban on recreational activities, including football.

2001–2010
Following the demise of the Taliban regime, the Afghan national team eventually returned to the international arena in 2002, when they played South Korea in the Asian Games, losing 2–0. Afghanistan participated in their first international tournament in the 2003 SAFF Gold Cup where they lost all three group stage matches to India, Pakistan and Sri Lanka. Later in the same year, Afghanistan took part in the 2004 AFC Asian Cup qualification where they won against Kyrgyzstan but lost to Nepal and failed to make it to the next round. Afghanistan started its FIFA World Cup campaign for the first time in 2003 where they played Turkmenistan in 2006 FIFA World Cup qualification. They lost both matches in aggregate of 13–0. This was the first time Afghanistan participated in FIFA World Cup qualification though they had been affiliated since 1948. The team went to Pakistan to take part in the 2005 South Asian Football Federation Gold Cup, which they lost to the Maldives.

They also participated in the first edition of the AFC Challenge Cup in 2006, for which they drew both matches with Chinese Taipei and the Philippines with Afghan footballers Hafizullah Qadami and Sayed Maqsood Hashemi both scoring to produce a drawn result, and on their second world cup campaign in 2010 FIFA World Cup qualification were eliminated by Syria. In the SAFF Championship 2008 Afghanistan lost to Bhutan but drew with Sri Lanka and Bangladesh. Afghanistan entered the second round of the AFC Challenge Cup in 2008, by winning in group D of the AFC Challenge Cup Qualification, drawing with Bangladesh and winning against Kyrgyzstan. In the 2008 AFC Challenge Cup, Afghanistan lost all group matches to India, Tajikistan and Turkmenistan. In 2009 SAFF Championship Afghanistan lost all its matches to Maldives, India and Nepal. Hashmatullah Barakzai scored Afghanistan's only goal against Maldives in that loss.

2014 FIFA World Cup qualification
Afghanistan competed in their third World Cup qualifying campaign playing the first leg of their first match against Palestine in Tajikistan due to security reasons, which they lost, and the second leg of the match in Palestine which they drew with Balal Arezou scoring, meaning they failed to advance to the second round and were eliminated.

2011 SAFF Championship

In 2011 SAFF Championship Afghanistan defeated Bhutan 8–1, the biggest victory in the history of the Afghanistan football team. In this match, Balal Arezou scored the only hat-trick of the competition with 4 goals and the team scored the quickest goal of the tournament through Ata Yamrali in the third minute. It was Afghanistan's first Semi-final. In the Semi-final of the tournament, the Afghans faced Nepal whom they beat 1–0 in extra time with the only goal scored by Balal Arezou in the 101st minute. It was the first win of Afghanistan over Nepal. In the final, Afghanistan played India to whom they lost 4–0.

2012 AFC Challenge Cup
Afghanistan defeated Bhutan 5–0 in 2012 AFC Challenge Cup qualification. In the first leg, they beat Bhutan 3–0 with Sidiq Walizada scoring all 3 goals, and 2–0 in the second leg. In the second qualification round, Afghanistan lost to Nepal and North Korea, whilst beating Sri Lanka but failed to qualify for the next stage.

Afghan Premier League
For the first time in the football history of Afghanistan the AFF announced a league where 8 teams will compete against each other. The league was established in 2012 with the first season running through September and October of that year. 8 teams were concurrently established in 2012 to become the inaugural competitors.

Players for the league were found through a reality television show called Maidan e Sabz ("Green Field"). The concept came from the Afghanistan Football Federation and the Afghanistan-based MOBY Group, which owns a number of TV channels and radio stations and is the largest media group in the country. MOBY Group channels will broadcast matches. Players were voted onto teams by a jury and by the television audience. Eight teams of 18 players, one from every region, were formed.

The Afghan High Peace Council has praised the creation and development of the League as an, "opportunity to bring peace and stability" to Afghanistan.

2013 SAFF Championship winners

On 20 August 2013 before the 2013 SAFF Championship Afghanistan played Pakistan in a FIFA approved friendly for the first time in 36 years. This was also the first time on home ground after a decade which ended with a 3–0 victory over Pakistan with goals from Sandjar Ahmadi, Ahmad Hatifi and Maruf Mohammadi.

Afghanistan entered the 2013 SAFF Championship as the highest ranked team by FIFA in the tournament placed at 139th. Afghanistan started the campaign with a 3-goal victory over Bhutan, with goals from Amiri also known as Afghanistan's best ever player, Azadzoy and Barakzai. The second match again ended with a 3–1 victory over Sri Lanka with goals from Rafi, Amiri and Barakzai. The Semi-final of the tournament was the repeat of last year's edition with Afghanistan again defeating Nepal with a solitary goal of Sandjar Ahmadi, that took Afghanistan in to the final of the tournament against India once again. Mansur Faqiryar of Afghanistan showed an outstanding goalkeeping performance by saving two back to back penalty kicks from Nepal in the last minutes of the match. The Final match of the tournament saw the 2011 SAFF Championship finalists again at Dashrath Stadium Nepal, where Afghanistan outplayed the defending champions India by 2 goals. Afghanistan showed an outstanding performance. Goals from Azadzoy and Sandjar Ahmadi in each half of the game put the Afghan football team in front, to claim their first SAFF Championship title in their history. Mansur Faqiryar was named the best player of the tournament, for his outstanding goal keeping skills throughout the tournament.

AFC Challenge Cup 2014
In the 2014 AFC Challenge Cup, Afghanistan did well to reach the Semi-final, losing to the eventual champions Palestine, 2–0. They finished their campaign in fourth spot, the country's highest finishing place in the short term the cup has existed, losing to Maldives on a penalty shoot out: (7–8) after a 1–1 draw for third spot of the competition. On 10 June 2014 Afghanistan Football Federation moved from South Asian Football Federation SAFF to the CAFF. At the 2014 Ballon D'or ceremony, the Afghanistan Football Federation won the FIFA Fair Play Award. Afghanistan was honored with the award for the outstanding performance of the Afghanistan football during the year, despite the chaos of war and difficult political situations the country is facing. FIFA made a statement and posted on its website that "Following a year of remarkable achievement in grassroots level football, building infrastructure to further develop football throughout the country and nurturing a professional league despite enduring over a decade of disorder stemming from war, Afghanistan has been presented the 2013 FIFA Fair Play Award."

2018 FIFA World Cup qualification

On 9 February 2015, it was confirmed that the AFF signed a new coach for the national team. German-Bosnian trainer Slaven Skeledzic, signed a 1-year contract with the AFF. The new trainer had earlier coached the under 17 and under 19 teams in Germany. Skeledzic played football in Germany and coached youth teams in the Bundesliga. On 27 April 2015 the AFF signed a contract with a new sponsor called Alokozay Group of Companies.

Afghanistan began the qualification with a 6–0 loss against Syria. After this match they had to play against lower ranked Cambodia. They won their first World Cup qualification match in the history of Afghanistan football. In their 3rd match against Japan, Afghanistan lost again 6–0. Against Singapore they lost 1–0. They lost 5–2 against Syria. In October 2015 the AFF forced Skeledzic to resign from his position, after the 5–2 defeat against Syria. In November 2015, the Afghan National Team announced that Petar Segrt was appointed as the new head coach. With a new coach and new players Afghanistan won their 2nd match against Cambodia with 3–0. After the qualifications the SAFF Championship started.

2015 SAFF Championship

This was the last edition of the SAFF Championship where the national team of Afghanistan would play. After the team was announced Afghanistan began preparing for the tournament. They were in a group of 4 countries which was: Maldives, Bangladesh, Bhutan and Afghanistan. Afghanistan won the first match 4–0 against Bangladesh. After they won the second match against Bhutan 3–0 they qualified for the semi-finals. They won their last match against Maldives 4–1. In the semi-final Afghanistan had to play against Sri Lanka. The match ended in a 5–0 win for Afghanistan. Eventually after reaching the final quite easily, Afghanistan had to play against tournament favorite India. This was a replay of the finals in the 2011 and 2013 SAFF Championships. After 90 minutes the match ended in a 1–1 draw. After this moment India scored the 2–1 and won the 2015 SAFF Championship for the 7th time. Khaibar Amani was given the topscorer of the tournament award with 4 goals.

2019 AFC Asian Cup qualification

When the tournament ended Afghanistan still had a chance to qualify for the 2019 AFC Asian Cup. After their second loss against Japan with a 5–0 defeat, Afghanistan had to win against Singapore to qualify as 4th best in their group. And so they did with a 2–1 win against Singapore and a qualification spot for the 3rd round of the 2019 AFC Asian Cup.

After the World Cup qualification ended Afghanistan played some friendly games. In September against Lebanon which the game ended in a 2–0 win for Lebanon. In October against Malaysia which ended in a 1–1 draw. Before the match against Tajikistan Segrt called up 24 players which did not include the player Zohib Islam Amiri because the player previously made the decision to not play anymore for Afghanistan. But without letting Segrt know the AFF did included Amiri in the squad. Segrt disagreed with the AFF and made the decision to quit as the head coach of the national team. This was just after his 1-year anniversary with the national team. The match against Tajikistan ended in a 1–0 loss for Afghanistan. Anoush Dastgir led the team as interim coach for this match.

In February 2017 the AFF announced the signing of Otto Pfister as the new head coach of the national team. Afghanistan played a friendly game against Singapore before the Asian Cup qualification match against Vietnam. Afghanistan won the game with 2–1 with goals from Mukhammad and Azadzoy. The important Asian Cup qualification match against Vietnam ended in a 1–1 draw with a goal from Hassan Amin. However, Afghanistan since then has suffered a serious setback. In the match against opponent Cambodia in Phnom Penh, which Afghanistan once defeated 4–0, Afghanistan had shocked by losing 0–1 against the same rival. Later, Afghanistan suffered second defeat, this time against Jordan, with the score 1–4 in Amman. Between two official qualification matches, Afghanistan also lost 0–2 to Oman in a friendly match. Afghanistan's late effort later only helped them to manage a 3–3 draw against Jordan, and Afghanistan was near the verge of being eliminated if they could not defeat Vietnam in the fifth match. At the crucial match against Vietnam in Hanoi, despite Afghanistan had nearly outplayed the host, failed efforts and bad lucks had prevented Afghanistan to seal a victory, as the match ended 0–0, effectively eliminated Afghanistan from the qualification while Vietnam went to seal the ticket to the 2019 AFC Asian Cup with Jordan, after 1–0 victory over Cambodia. Afghanistan played their last match against Cambodia who also failed to qualify for the 2019 AFC Asian Cup. The match ended in a 2–1 victory for Afghanistan. After the match it was announced that Pfister will leave his job and that Anoush Dastgir will be the new head coach of the national team with the addition of Shabir Isoufi as the new assistant coach of Afghanistan. On 13 July 2018 it was announced that Afghanistan will play a friendly game in Kabul, Afghanistan for the first time since 2013 against Palestine.

Afghanistan is currently rivals with Pakistan in many sports, including cricket and football. In a historic match in 2013, Afghanistan beat Pakistan, 3–0, to rekindle a famous rivalry and to play since the chaos in Afghanistan began. In their most recent matchup vs Pakistan, they lost, 2–1.

Team image

Home stadium

Major football matches in Afghanistan are held at the Afghan Football Federation Stadium (popularly known as the Ghazi Stadium) in Kabul. It was built in 1923 during the reign of King Amanullah Khan, who is regarded as Ghazi (Hero) for the Afghan victory in the Third Anglo-Afghan War and gaining independence for his nation after the Anglo-Afghan Treaty of 1919. The stadium has the capacity to house 25,000 people. The first international football match hosted there was played between Iran and Afghanistan in 1941 and ended as a draw, 0–0. Their 2006 FIFA World Cup qualification second leg match was played at the Ghazi Stadium against Turkmenistan which Afghanistan lost 2–0, having previously lost the first leg 11–0. The stadium is maintained and controlled by the Afghanistan Football Federation. The Afghan Premier League and other local football tournaments take place in the stadium. The Ghazi Stadium was renovated in 2011 after the entire ground was removed and replaced with new soil and artificial turf placed on top. The stadium now holds bigger sporting events. The proposed construction of a new national stadium was completed in the 2013/2014 season which cost 25 million euros. In 2015 FIFA helped the AFF with the reconstruction of new youth teams and develop also women's football for the national team.

Kit
Since 2002 until 2004, the Japanese sports brand ASICS was the sponsor for the national team. From 2005, the German sports brand Adidas was the sponsor of the national team until 2008. In 2009, the Danish sports brand Hummel equipped the national team. In 2011 the Afghanistan Football Federation had signed a four-year contract with Hummel, to provide both the men's and women's national teams with all of the sportswear from 2011 to 2015. On 6 March 2015, the Afghan Football Federation signed a new four-year contract with Hummel till 2019. On 27 April 2015, the AFF signed a contract with a new sponsor called Alokozay Group of Companies. This sponsor will be on the shirts of the national team. Hummel released in 2016 the new kits for Afghanistan. It included an integrated hijab for the female Afghanistan footballers to play with while being covered from head to toe. In December 2018, Hummel announced that it will no longer sponsor Afghanistan's football association after allegations emerged of physical, psychological and sexual abuse committed by male employees against players from the country's women's national team.

Sponsors
Alokozay, MOBY Group, Lemar & TOLO are the national team's sponsors.

Flag
The Afghanistan national team still uses the old tricolor flag of the Islamic Republic of Afghanistan instead of the white flag of the Taliban government, despite the group's takeover of the country in 2021.

Results and fixtures 

The following are details of Afghanistan's most recent match results, as well as any future matches that have been scheduled.

2022

Coaching staff

Coaching history

Caretaker managers are listed in italics.

 None (1941–75)
  Vladimir Salenko (1975–1976)
  Sergei Salnikov (1976–1977)
  Nikolai Yefimov (1977–1978)
  Islam Gul (1978–1979)
  Sayed Ahmad Zia Muzafari (1979–1981)
  Khwaja Aziz (1981–1987)
  Gennadi Sarychev (1987–1988)
 None (1988–2003)
  Mir Ali Asghar Akbarzada (2003–2004)
  Mohammad Yousef Kargar (2004–2005)
  Klaus Stärk (2005–2008)
  Mohammad Yousef Kargar (2008–2014)
  Erich Rutemöller (2014–2015)
  Hossein Saleh (2015)
  Slaven Skeledžić (2015) 
  Petar Segrt (2015–2016)
  Anoush Dastgir (2016–2017)
  Otto Pfister (2017–2018)
  Anoush Dastgir (2018–2023)
 Farhad Kazemi (2023-2028)

Players

Current squad
The following players were called up for the matches against Saigon FC, Vietnam, Hong Kong, India and Cambodia, between 27 May and 14 June 2022.
Caps and goals are correct as of 14 June 2022 after the match against Cambodia.

Recent call-ups
The following players have been called up for the team within the last 12 months and are still available for selection.

Records

Players in bold are still active with Afghanistan.

Most appearances

Top goalscorers

Competitive record

FIFA World Cup

AFC Asian Cup

Summer Olympics

Asian Games

AFC Challenge Cup

SAFF Championship

Honours

Regional
SAFF Championship
Champions (1): 2013
Runners-up (2): 2011, 2015
South Asian Games
Silver Medal (1): 2010

See also
Afghanistan women's national football team
Afghanistan national under-23 football team
Afghanistan national under-20 football team
Afghanistan national under-17 football team
Afghanistan national beach soccer team
Afghanistan national futsal team
Afghanistan Football Federation
Roshan Premier League
Football in Afghanistan
Sport in Afghanistan

Notes

References

External links

 Official website
 ELORATINGS

 
Asian national association football teams